Magiko is a settlement in the Vistonida municipal unit, Xanthi regional unit of Greece.

Populated places in Xanthi (regional unit)